Alexander David Sobel (born 26 April 1975) is a British Labour and Co-operative politician who has been the Member of Parliament (MP) for Leeds North West since the 2017 general election.

Early life
Born in Leeds on 26 April 1975, Sobel grew up in Beaconsfield attending Holtspur Middle School and John Hampden Grammar School.  As a teenager, he joined anti-fascist and environmental protests in Leeds. After graduating in information systems at the University of Leeds in 1997, Sobel worked with social enterprises, and ran the regional body Social Enterprise Yorkshire and the Humber from 2009 until 2017.

Political career
Sobel joined the Labour Party in 1997. In the 2005 general election, he was the Labour candidate for the Beaconsfield constituency. Having previously run unsuccessfully in Leeds City Council elections from 2002 to 2007, he was elected as a Labour councillor for the Moortown ward in the 2012 council election, and was re-elected in the 2016 council election. He led the council's work on air pollution and climate change.  In the 2015 United Kingdom general election, he unsuccessfully contested the Leeds North West constituency. During the election, Sobel and the Leeds North West Labour Party were required to publish an apology leaflet and pay legal costs after falsely claiming that the incumbent Liberal Democrat MP Greg Mulholland voted for the Academies Act 2010. In December 2015, Sobel co-founded the activist group Open Labour.

At the 2017 general election, he was elected as MP for Leeds North West, gaining the seat from Greg Mulholland who represented the Liberal Democrats. In October 2017, Sobel was elected as one of the officers of the All-Party Parliamentary Group on rare, genetic and undiagnosed conditions. In 2019, he formed an All-Party Parliamentary Group aiming to reduce carbon emissions to net zero as early as possible.

In July 2019, Sobel became Parliamentary Private Secretary to the shadow foreign secretary Emily Thornberry. Sobel was re-elected at the 2019 general election with an increased majority of 10,749.

In January 2020, Sobel apologised after receiving criticism for meeting with the director of Population Matters, a controversial human population control charity.

In April 2020, Sobel became shadow minister for arts, heritage and tourism.

In December 2021, Alex Sobel MP became the Shadow Minister for Nature in the Shadow Department for the Environment, Food and Rural Affairs.

Personal life
Sobel is married with two children and lives in Leeds.

References

External links

1975 births
Living people
Labour Co-operative MPs for English constituencies
UK MPs 2017–2019
UK MPs 2019–present
Councillors in Leeds
Labour Party (UK) councillors
Alumni of the University of Leeds
Jewish British politicians
Members of the Fabian Society
People from Weetwood
People educated at John Hampden Grammar School
English Jews